The Goldrush Tour was a North American concert tour by Santogold, performed in support of her eponymous debut album. Sponsored by MySpace Music, it took place in September and October 2008.

The tour is the first that Santogold has headlined herself. She previously opened for M.I.A. on her KALA Back to P.O.W.A. Tour in 2007 and Coldplay on their Viva la Vida Tour in 2008. The tour spanned fifteen dates in the United States of America, with one in Canada.  Santogold performed with both a live band and a DJ. Kanye West's DJ A-Trak will open for Santogold from September 23 to September 27, while Mates of State will support Santogold from September 28 to October 14. Low vs Diamond perform with Santi for a number of the dates, while Plastic Little, Trouble Andrew, and The Ting Tings made appearances. The tour went to Australia in January 2009.

Santogold also performs with the two backing dancers called SG-1s, who wear deadpan expressions and matching sunglasses. They occasionally provide backing vocals and synchronized dancing. Both girls are often in Santogold's music videos as well. One of the SG-1s is Moni-Jo, a musician, dancer and actress. The SG-1s however call themselves Agatha and Angus Gold.

Critical reception
The Boston Globe said that Santogold "is built for theaters and maybe even arenas." Metro International agreed, saying "Santi White won't be opening for the likes of Coldplay again."

Santi was criticized for lipsyncing. Santogold does not always make use of her live band - one reviewer noted that "there is something mildly deflating about watching someone sing song after song backed not by actual people playing guitar, bass, and drums in the moment - right in front of us, right now - but rather the freeze-dried perfection of a digital recording of people playing guitar, bass and drums, somewhere else, a long time ago."

Set list
"You'll Find a Way"
"L.E.S. Artistes"
"Shove It"
"Say Aha"
"Lights Out" (Diplo's Panda Bear Remix)
"Anne"
"My Superman"
"Guns of Brooklyn"
"Icarus"
"Starstruck"
"Creator"
Encore
"Get It Up"
"Unstoppable"

Tour dates

References

External links
 Santogold on Myspace

2008 concert tours
2009 concert tours